Liván López Azcuy (born January 24, 1982) is a male freestyle wrestler from Cuba who competes in the 66 kg category. In 2011, he won a gold medal at the Pan American Games and a bronze medal at the 2011 World Wrestling Championships. The next year he won a bronze medal at the 2012 Summer Olympics.

References

External links
 

Living people
1982 births
Cuban male sport wrestlers
Wrestlers at the 2012 Summer Olympics
Wrestlers at the 2016 Summer Olympics
Olympic wrestlers of Cuba
Olympic bronze medalists for Cuba
Olympic medalists in wrestling
Medalists at the 2012 Summer Olympics
World Wrestling Championships medalists
Pan American Games gold medalists for Cuba
Pan American Games bronze medalists for Cuba
Pan American Games medalists in wrestling
Wrestlers at the 2015 Pan American Games
Medalists at the 2015 Pan American Games
People from Pinar del Río
20th-century Cuban people
21st-century Cuban people